Niun Niggung is a studio album by German electronica duo Mouse on Mars. It was released in 1999. It peaked at number 76 on the German Albums Chart.

Critical reception
Andrew Duke of Exclaim! gave the album a favorable review, describing it as "an album that immediately becomes a must-have for the electronic music enthusiast."

The Wire named Niun Niggung the record of the year in its annual critics' poll. Spin placed it at number 16 on the "20 Best Albums of 2000" list. NME named it the 33rd best album of 1999.

Track listing

Personnel
Credits adapted from liner notes.

 Jan St. Werner – composition, arrangement, production
 Andi Toma – composition, arrangement, production
 F.X.Randomiz – digital soundprocessing, sample support
 Dodo Nkishi – drums
 Harald "Sack" Ziegler – french horn, brass arrangement
 Perry White – bass clarinet, flute
 Scott White – cello, violin
 Matty Arouse – fiddle
 Markus Dirk – bass trumpet

Charts

References

External links
 
 

1999 albums
Mouse on Mars albums
Rough Trade Records albums
Thrill Jockey albums
Domino Recording Company albums